Shed Skin Papa is a 2016 Hong Kong comedy-drama film written by Norihiko Tsukada and Roy Szeto based on Tsuksda's Japanese play Nukegara, and directed by Szeto, who had previously directed an award-winning Hong Kong stage adaptation of the play titled Shed Skin in 2011. The film stars Louis Koo as a washed-out, debt-ridden film director who must take care of his seventy nine-year-old dementia-ridden father (Francis Ng), who begins to shed a layer a skin everyday where regains his youth. Shed Skin Papa made its world premiere at the 29th Tokyo International Film Festival on 26 October 2016 where it was shown in competition for the Tokyo Grand Prix The film was theatrically released in Hong Kong on 10 May 2018.

Plot
Washed-out film director Tin Lik-hang (Louis Koo) is encountering a series of crisis in life. His mother has recently passed away, his film company is bankrupt and debt-ridden as a result, while wife wants a divorce. On the other hand, he must now take care of his 79-year-old dementia-ridden father, Yat-hung (Francis Ng). In the midst of Lik-hang's miserable plight, Yat-hung suddenly begins to shed a layer of skin every day like a cicada, each time making him look ten years younger, from ages 60 to 52 to 37 to 28 to 19. As Yat-hung approaches the same age as his son, they bond at a football stadium where they used to spend their weekends. Yat-hung even helps frighten debt collectors after his son, and charms both Lik-hang's wife and his mistress. With Yat-hung's six stages of life reappearing, Lik-hang, who never seriously got along with his father, was able to travel into the six eras of his father's life, and gain new understandings for his father, who struggled to make a better life for his family. Lik-hang also has the opportunity to have one final meal with his mother, before returning to his reality with passion anew to revive his own career and marriage after learning from the twists and turns experienced by his father.

Cast
Francis Ng as Tin Yat-hung (田一雄)
Louis Koo as Tin Lik-hang (田力行)
Kristal Tin as Yam Sa-sa (任莎莎)
Jacky Cai as Chuk Lai-wah (祝麗華)
Jessie Li as Choi Chi-miu (蔡籽苗)
Power Chan as Frankie
Chen Kuan-tai as Brother Tai (泰哥)

Production
To prepare for his role as Louis Koo's father, Francis Ng asked Koo whether he could meet Koo's father and had a meal with Koo and his father to observe their relationship and emulate it into his acting. Ng, whose role's age spans from youth to elderly, was initially only interested in playing the roles closest to his age, but was persuaded by director Roy Szeto to play all age versions of the role.

Accolades

References

2016 films
2010s fantasy comedy-drama films
Hong Kong fantasy comedy-drama films
2010s Cantonese-language films
Shaw Brothers Studio films
Hong Kong films based on plays
Films about film directors and producers
Films about families
Films set in Hong Kong
Films shot in Hong Kong
2016 comedy films
2016 drama films
2010s Hong Kong films